This is a list of Green Party leaders and deputy leaders in Canada.

References

 
List of Green party leaders in Canada